George Barlow (19 September 1885 – 3 March 1921) was an English footballer. He was part of Great Britain's squad for the football tournament at the 1908 Summer Olympics, but he did not play in any matches.

References

External links
 

1885 births
1921 deaths
English footballers
Everton F.C. players
Place of birth missing
Association football wingers